The Tunica-Biloxi Indian Tribe, formerly known as the Tunica-Biloxi Indian Tribe of Louisiana, is a federally recognized tribe of primarily Tunica and Biloxi people, located in east central Louisiana. Descendants of Ofo (Siouan-speakers), Avoyel (a Natchez people), and Choctaw (Muskogean) are also enrolled in the tribe.

In the 21st century,  the people speak mostly English and French. Many live on the Tunica-Biloxi Indian Reservation in central Avoyelles Parish, just south of the city of Marksville, Louisiana, and overlapping its boundaries.

The 2010 census lists 951 persons self-identified as at least partly of Tunica-Biloxi, with 669 of those identifying as solely of Tunica-Biloxi ancestry.

History

By the Middle Mississippian period, local Late Woodland peoples in the Central Mississippi Valley had developed or adopted a Mississippian lifestyle, with maize agriculture, hierarchical political structures, mussel shell-tempered pottery, and participation in the Southeastern Ceremonial Complex (SECC). The archaeological evidence suggests that the valley was home to several competing paramount chiefdoms, with supporting vassal states. The groups in the area have been defined by archaeologists by archaeological phases; these include the Menard, Tipton, Belle Meade-Walls, Parkin and Nodena phases.

In the spring of 1541 Hernando de Soto and his army approached the eastern bank of the Mississippi River, coming upon the Province of Quizquiz (pronounced "keys-key"). These people spoke a dialect of the Tunica language, which is a language isolate. At that time, these related groups covered a large region extending along both sides of the Mississippi River in present-day Mississippi and Arkansas, as the expedition would soon learn.

Based on evaluations of the three surviving de Soto narratives for topography, linguistics and cultural traits, combined with archaeological excavations and analysis, most archaeologists and ethnohistorians have agreed to identify the Menard, Walls, Belle Meade, Parkin and Nodena phases as the de Soto-named provinces of Anilco, Quizquiz, Aquixo, Casqui and Pacaha, respectively.

It was 150 years before another European group recorded the Tunica. In 1699 the LaSource expedition (coming downriver from French Canada) encountered the Tunica, describing them as a modestly sized tribe numbering only a few hundred warriors. They and other peoples had suffered from smallpox epidemics, which had high mortality rates as they had no natural immunity to this new disease carried by Europeans.

By the time the French arrived, the Central Mississippi Valley was sparsely occupied by the Quapaw. They became significant allies to the French and aided their successful settlement. The French established a mission among the Tunica around 1700, on the Yazoo River. Father Antoine Davion was assigned to the Tunica, as well as to the smaller tribes of the Koroa, Yazoo, and Houspé tribes.

The Tunica were skilled traders and entrepreneurs, especially in the manufacture and distribution of salt, a valuable item to both native and Europeans. Salt was extremely important in the trade between the French and the various Caddoan groups in what are now northwestern Louisiana and southwestern Arkansas. The Tunica were believed to be the middlemen in the trade of salt from the Caddoan areas to the French.

By the early 18th century, the tribes along the lower Mississippi River were a target of Chickasaw raids for the English slave trade in South Carolina. By 1706 the Tunica decided to move.

As their enemies the Natchez were to their immediate south, they moved to the Mississippi side of the Mississippi and Red River confluence. This allowed them to keep control of their salt trade, as the Red River also connected to their salt source in the Caddoan areas.

They established a loose collection of hamlets and villages at present-day Angola, Louisiana. The archeological remains of a small hamlet from this time period were discovered in 1976 by an inmate of Angola Prison. It is known as the Bloodhound Site.

During the 1710s and 1720s, war periodically broke out between the French and the Natchez. The last uprising in 1729, the Natchez Massacre, was the largest; the Natchez killed most of the French at the village of Natchez and Fort Rosalie. French colonists gained the aid of Indian allies and returned to the villages, killing or capturing most of the Natchez. The survivors were sold into slavery.

In 1729 the chiefs of the village sent emissaries to potential allies, including the Yazoo, Koroa, Illinois, Chickasaw, and Choctaw. The Natchez Rebellion or Natchez War expanded into a larger regional conflict with many repercussions. The Tunica were initially reluctant to fight on either side.

In June 1730 the Head Chief of the Tunica, Cahura-Joligo, agreed to let a small party of Natchez refugees settle near his village (present-day Angola), provided they were unarmed. A few days later, the chief of the Natchez arrived at the Tunica village with a hundred men, and an unknown number of women and children. They concealed Chickasaw and Koroa warriors in the canebrake around the village. Cahura-Joligo informed the Natchez party that he could not receive them unless they gave up their arms. They said they intended to do so, but asked to keep their arms a while longer. He consented and had food distributed to his new guests. A dance was held that night. After the dance and when the village had gone to sleep, the Natchez, Chicasaw and Koroa attacked their hosts. Cahura-Joligo killed four Natchez during the fighting, but was killed along with 12 of his warriors. His war-chief Brides les Boeufs (Buffalo Tamer) repulsed the attack. He rallied the warriors, and after fighting for five days and nights, regained control of the village. Twenty Tunica were killed and as many wounded in the fighting. They killed 33 of the Natchez warriors.

After the attack at Angola, in 1731 the Tunica moved a few miles away to the Trudeau site. Over the years, they buried as grave goods large amounts of European trade goods, including beads, porcelain, muskets, kettles and other items, as well as locally produced pottery in the Tunica tribal style. When discovered in the 20th century, these artifacts attested to their extensive trade with Europeans, as well as the wealth of the Tunica.

They stayed at this location into the 1760s, when the French ceded control west of the Mississippi to the Spanish following the French defeat by the British in the Seven Years' War.

Other tribes had also settled in the area, including the Offagoula, Pascagoula and Biloxi. The latter came to have a close relationship with the Tunica people. During this time, numerous Anglo-American settlers migrated into the region, as the British had taken over former French territories east of the Mississippi River. The Tunica had become acculturated to European ways, although they still tattooed themselves and practiced some of their native religious customs. With the British in charge of the Western Florida colony at this time, and the Spanish in control of Louisiana, politics were volatile in the area. In 1779 Governor Galvez led a force, which included Tunica and other tribal warriors, to take the British-held town of Baton Rouge. This was the last military campaign for which the Tunica were recorded.

By sometime in the late 1780s or 1790s, the Tunica moved again, probably because of the large influx of Anglo-Americans moving into the area. They moved west to a site on the Red River named Avoyelles. In 1794 Marco Litche (recorded by the French as Marc Eliche), a Sephardic Jewish trader from Venice,  established a trading post in the area. A European-American settlement developed around the post and became known as Marksville. It was noted on Louisiana maps as of 1809.

After acquisition by US
Marksville was a good location for a trading post, as the Red River was still an important avenue of trade. But rapid changes took place. Under Napoleon Bonaparte, France reacquired the area in 1800. After failing to regain power in its colony of Saint-Domingue, France sold the large territory known as the Louisiana Purchase to the fledgling United States in 1803. Anglo-Americans migrated to Louisiana in great numbers, mostly from the southern United States, eventually changing its culture to one dominated by the English language and Protestant Christianity, especially in the northern parts of the area. In the late 19th century, railroads surpassed the rivers as main avenues of trade and transportation, and the Marksville area became a quiet backwater.

The only U.S. government mention of the Tunica from 1803 to 1938 was made in 1806 by an Indian Commissioner for Louisiana. He noted that the Tunica numbered only about 25 men, lived in Avoyelles Parish, and made their livings by occasionally hiring out as boatmen. Although the Tunica were prosperous at this time, eventually problems with their white neighbors would take its toll. The whites imposed the binary social system based on slavery as a racial caste, recognizing only whites and blacks (in which they classified all people of color). They also tended to discount Indian identity among mixed-race people, failing to understand that they identified culturally and socially as Tunica. By the late 19th century, the dominant white conservative Democrats imposed legal racial segregation after disenfranchising blacks and other minorities of color. The Tunica became subsistence farmers, with some hunting and fishing to support themselves. Others turned to sharecropping on their white neighbors' land.

As the 20th century dawned, the Tunica came together around their ancient heritage. They had managed to retain possession of the majority of their communal land, some still spoke the Tunica language, and they still practiced traditional tribal ceremonies.

20th century to present

Gradually the remnant descendants of other local tribes (the Ofo, Avoyel, Choctaw, and Biloxi) merged into the Tunica. They have preserved much of their ethnic identity, maintaining their tribal government and the hereditary chieftainship up to the mid-1970s.

The modern Tunica-Biloxi tribe, which has a written constitution and elected government, was recognized by the federal government in 1981. They live in Mississippi and east central Louisiana. The modern tribe is composed of Tunica, Biloxi (a Siouan-speaking people from the Gulf coast), Ofo (also a Siouan people), Avoyel (a Natchezan people), and Mississippi Choctaw. Many live on the Tunica-Biloxi Indian Reservation in central Avoyelles Parish, just south of the city of Marksville, Louisiana. A part of the city extends onto reservation land.

Currently, they operate Louisiana's first land based casino, Paragon Casino Resort, opened in Marksville in June 1994. The casino is known for its contributions back to its members. The 2000 census lists 648 persons identified as Tunica.

Tribal government currently consists of an elected tribal council and tribal chairman. The tribe maintains its own police force, health services, education department, housing authority, and court system. Former tribal chairman Earl J. Barbry Sr., was widely noted as one of the longest-serving chairmen in Indian Country, serving from 1978 until his death in July 2013. Barbry was succeeded as chairman by Marshall Pierite, formerly vice chairman of the tribe, from August 2013 through April 2014. Barbry's son, Joey Barbry, served as chairman from April 2014. Marshall Pierite again became chairman upon his election in April 2018.

Tunica treasure
In the 1960s a treasure hunter named Leonard Charrier began searching for artifacts at the Trudeau Landing site in West Feliciana Parish, Louisiana. The Tunica, who felt he had stolen tribal heirlooms and desecrated the graves of their ancestors, were outraged.

In the 1970s the site was excavated by archaeologists, uncovering large amounts of pottery, European trade goods and other artifacts deposited as grave goods by the Tunica from 1731 to 1764 when they occupied the site. With help from the State of Louisiana, the tribe filed suit to gain title to the artifacts, which has subsequently become known as the "Tunica treasure". The case took a decade to be decided in the courts, but the ruling became a landmark in American Indian history. It helped to lay the groundwork for new federal legislation, the Native American Graves Protection and Repatriation Act (NAGPRA), passed in 1990.

Because the artifacts had been separated from the original burials and connections were lost, the tribe decided to build a museum to house these items. Members of the tribe were trained as conservators in order to repair damage done to the artifacts by the centuries underground and handling during the ten-year court battle. The museum was built in the shape of the ancient temple mounds of their people, with the earthen structure to take the symbolic place of the original burial underground. It opened in 1989 as The Tunica-Biloxi Regional Indian Center and Museum. Due to structural problems, it was closed in 1999, with plans for a new larger facility underway. Today the Tunica Treasure collection is housed in the Tunica-Biloxi Cultural and Educational Resources Center, a state-of-the-art facility that includes a library, conservation center, distance-learning center, conference facilities, tribal offices, and museum on the tribal reservation in Marksville. Eighty percent of the artifacts of the Tunica Treasure have been restored.

Federal recognition
Formal efforts to be recognized by the federal government were begun in the 1940s when Chief Eli Barbry, Horace Pierite, Clarence Jackson, and Sam Barbry traveled to Washington, D.C. to consult with the Bureau of Indian Affairs. Federal recognition would have entitled the tribe to benefit from social programs under the Indian Reorganization Act of 1934. A succession of chiefs, including Chief Horace Pierite Sr, would work at the task. With the Tunica treasure proving their ancient tribal identity, the tribe was able to gain state and federal recognition. They were recognized by the United States government in 1981 as the Tunica Biloxi Indians of Louisiana, later taking the name of Tunica-Biloxi Indian Tribe.

Economic development 
The Tunica-Biloxi Tribe operates Louisiana's first land-based casino, Paragon Casino Resort. It opened in Marksville in June 1994. It is now the largest employer in Avoyelles Parish.

The Tribe also owns and operates a Tribal Lending Enterprise—the online installment loan company, Mobiloans—and a finance and production company, Acacia Entertainment. Mobiloans works with Think Finance on underwriting, loan servicing, and other technology processes related to running the business. Acacia Entertainment is a joint venture between the Tribe's Economic Development Corporation and film producer Matthew George. According to the Tribe, Acacia aims to produce two to three films per year.

Tunica and Biloxi languages

The Tunica (or Tonica, or less common form Yuron) language is a language isolate. The Tunica tribe historically lived close to the Ofo and Avoyeles tribes, but communication among the three depended on their use of the Mobilian Jargon or French.

The last known native speaker of the Tunica language, Sesostrie Youchigant, died in 1948. Linguist Mary Haas had worked with Youchigant in the 1930s to describe what he remembered of the language. She published the description in A Grammar of the Tunica Language in 1941, followed by Tunica Texts in 1950, and Tunica Dictionary in 1953. Tunica is a reawakening language, with immersion programs and youth summer camps teaching second-language learners.

The Biloxi language is a Siouan language which was at one time spoken by the Biloxi people in Louisiana and southeast Texas. The Biloxi were first noted in European records as living along the Biloxi Bay in the mid-17th century, but by the mid-18th century, they had migrated into Louisiana to avoid European encroachment. Some were also noted in Texas in the early 19th century. By the early 19th century their numbers had dwindled. In 1934, the last native speaker, Emma Jackson, was in her 80s. Morris Swadesh and Mary Haas met her on a linguistic survey trip in September 1934 and confirmed her status as a speaker of the language.

Most modern Tunica speak English, with a few older members speaking French as a first language.

Notable Tunica-Biloxi

 Earl Barbry, an American politician and Native American leader, former chairman of the Tunica-Biloxi Tribe.
 Allen Barbre, an American football offensive tackle who plays for the Denver Broncos.
 Chief Sesostrie Youchigant, former chief of the Tunica-Biloxi tribe and last Tunica native speaker, provided information about the Tunica language to researchers.

See also

 List of sites and peoples visited by the Hernando de Soto Expedition

Notes

References
 Tunica-Biloxi Reservation, Louisiana, United States Census Bureau

External links

 Tunica-Biloxi Tribe of Louisiana, official website
 Tunica-Biloxi History

American Indian reservations in Louisiana
Federally recognized tribes in the United States
Indigenous peoples of the Southeastern Woodlands
Native American tribes in Louisiana
Siouan peoples